{{Infobox video game
| collapsible = 
| state = 
| italic title = 
| title = 3 in 1 College & Pro Football
| image = 3 in 1 College & Pro Football.jpg
| alt = 
| caption = 
| developer = 
| publisher = Lance Haffner Games
| series = 
| engine = 
| platforms = Apple II, Atari 8-bit, Commodore 64, MS-DOS
| released = 1984: Apple II1985: C64, MS-DOS1987: Atari 8-bit| genre = Sports
| modes = 
}}3 in 1 College & Pro Football' is a sports video game published by Lance Haffner Games for the Apple II in 1984. It was ported to the Atari 8-bit family, Commodore 64, and MS-DOS.

Gameplay3 in 1 College & Pro Football is a game in which real college and professional players and teams are simulated.

Reception
Johnny L. Wilson reviewed the game for Computer Gaming World, and stated that "With both CQ and 3 IN 1 on my shelf, I never have to worry about the matchups on the tube."

Wyatt Lee reviewed the game for Computer Gaming World, and stated that "Minus yardage must be noted for those who want graphics and further losses must be assessed for the limited play selection. The offensive playbook in this game is limited to 14 plays and the defensive playbook contains only 6 alignments."

References

External links
Review in Compute!Review in Commodore Power/PlayReview in ANALOG ComputingArticle in InCiderReview in Compute!'s Gazette''

1984 video games
American football video games
Apple II games
Atari 8-bit family games
College football video games
Commodore 64 games
DOS games
Video games developed in the United States